The 2020–21 UAE League Cup was the 13th season of the UAE League Cup, Al Nasr were the defending champions after winning their second title against Shabab Al Ahli. The competition was set to start on September but it was postponed. The competition started on 8 October 2020. On 9 April, Shabab Al Ahli clinched the title after beating Al Nasr 5–4 on penalty shootout.

First round
Source: soccerway
All times are local (UTC+04:00)

The first round consist of twelve teams excluding the defending champions and current league winners, this season has seen a format change in the league cup instead of its usual group stage format, to cut down on fixtures.

First leg

Second leg

Quarter-finals
The quarter finals will have eight teams, six winners of the first round joined with defending champions (Al Nasr) and Sharjah who got a bye from the first round.

First leg

Second leg

Semi-finals

First leg

Second leg

Final

Top scorers
As of 2 March 2021

References

UAE League Cup seasons
United Arab Emirates
2020–21 in Emirati football
UAE League Cup, 2020-21